Hypospila tamsi is a species of moth in the family Erebidae. It is found on the New Hebrides.

References

Moths described in 1951
Hypospila